Badshahnagar railway station is a very important railway station on the Barabanki–Lucknow Suburban Railway. It serves the Badshah Nagar locality of Indira Nagar. The station is located in a very densely populated area; thus, it handles a large amount of traffic. The number of platforms, however, can not be increased due to lack of space. The railway management has provided many services and facilities to cope up with traffic. Earlier a few trains like Gorakhpur Intercity Express used to originate / terminate here, but now it has been cancelled. Since this is small station with 2 platforms, it is now completely saturated with trains and railway is now compelled to develop Gomti Nagar as a terminal station.

Trains from Badshahnagar 
Currently 41 trains pass through, 1 originates and 1 terminate at this station. This makes it a very important railway station in Lucknow city. It handles a large amount of passenger pressure.
Trains originating /terminating here-

Some of important trains passing through this station are

MEMU services from this station

References 

Railway stations in Lucknow